The Norwegian Society of Pediatricians is the Norwegian association of pediatricians.

The society was founded in 1919 by Axel Johannessen, the first professor of pediatrics in Norway. The society was originally named the Norwegian Pediatric Society, and was an independent association from its establishment. In 1928 it formally became a specialist association within the Norwegian Medical Association.

As of 2012, the society had 845 members, including 593 certified specialists in pediatrics. The society's journal is called Paidos – Journal of the Norwegian Society of Pediatricians (παιδός paidos is genitive of Greek παῖς país, child), and was established in 1983.

Chairmen
Axel Johannessen 1919 - 1922
Chr. Døderlein 1923 - 1924
Th. Frølich 1925 - 1926
Chr. Johannessen 1927 - 1928
R. Tschudi 1929 - 1930
Arthur Collett 1931 - 1932
Alex Brinchmann 1933 - 1934
K. Utheim Toverud 1935 - 1936
E. Ziesler 1937 - 1938
L. Stoltenberg 1939 - 1940
L. Salomonsen 1941 - 
...
Arne Njå 1951
Jens Marstrander
Martin Fredrik Seip 1960-1962
...
Sverre O. Lie 1979
Oddmund Søvik
Jon Steen-Johnsen 1984–1985
Karl W. Wefring 1989
Jon Lunde -1999
Gro Flatabø Zanussi 1999-2001
Hans Jacob Bangstad 2001-2003
Jørgen Hurum 2003-2005
Leif Brunvand 2005-2007
Kristin Hodnekvam 2007-2009
Thor Willy Ruud Hansen 2009-2011
Marianne Nordhov 2011-

External links
Official site

Medical associations based in Norway
Norway